Attilio Bettega (19 February 1953 – 2 May 1985) was an Italian rally driver.

Biography
Bettega was born in Molveno, Trentino. In 1982, he joined the Lancia team driving the Lancia 037 after some years with Fiat. In his Lancia years he gained four podium finishes in rallies counting towards the World Rally Championship. His last podium was also his most successful one, driving his Lancia to second place at the 1984 Rallye Sanremo. In the 1985 season, he entered the Safari Rally and the Tour de Corse. In Corsica, on the fourth stage of the rally – Zerubia, Bettega lost control of his Lancia and crashed into a tree which ruptured into the driver's seat and killed him instantly. His co-driver Maurizio Perissinot survived the crash uninjured.

Bettega's death caused the safety of Group B cars to be called into question. Exactly one year later his former teammate Henri Toivonen and his co-driver Sergio Cresto with the Lancia Delta S4 #4 (same number as Bettega's car) died in a fireball accident at the same event, causing the ban on Group B.

Bettega's son, Alessandro Bettega, has followed his father's footsteps and is also a rally driver.

Sources

1953 births
1985 deaths
Sportspeople from Trentino
Italian rally drivers
World Rally Championship drivers
Racing drivers who died while racing
Sport deaths in France